The Derbyshire County FA Senior Cup is a local county football cup for teams based in the county of Derbyshire. Founded in 1883-1884, the first competition was won by Staveley, who beat Derby Midland 2-1 in the final. 1885-1886 saw Heeley from Yorkshire win the competition. It was not until 1892 that the county's top club Derby County first won the trophy. This delay was partially helped by a disagreement during Derby County's first season 1884-1885. After beating Derby St. Luke's and Wirksworth, Derby County were drawn at home to Long Eaton Rangers in the third round. The club applied for a week's delay in playing the fixture, however Long Eaton Rangers claimed the tie stating that they weren't aware of any change in date and had arrived on the set date to play. A correspondent of the 'Derby Daily Telegraph' wrote that the referee had arrived to take charge on the re-arranged date. The Derbyshire County FA awarded the tie to Long Eaton Rangers and the following season Derby County played in the Birmingham and District FA Senior Cup and set up their own Charity Cup. Players also boycotted playing for the County FA team in protest. It wasn't until 1887-1888 that Derby County next played in their own county's competition, where again in the third round they were drawn to play Long Eaton Rangers who won the tie 4-1.

Due to low attendances and receipts the Derbyshire County FA took the decision to change the cup to a League format in the hope that more games would increase their revenue and invited 14 teams to take part for the 1893-1894 season. This lasted one season.

Its final was traditionally held at Derby County's Baseball Ground on Easter Monday evening during the 1950s and 1960s but became a two-legged affair from season 1966–67 onwards. It reverted to a single leg tie at a neutral venue for season 2008–09.

In the 2010–11 competition, Derbyshire's two professional club's, Derby County and Chesterfield returned to the competition after a 25-year absence, after declining to take part in their traditional Derbyshire FA Centenary Cup pre-season competition. Their return was greeted with disappointment by some fans, who saw it as reducing a competition enjoyed by non-league football followers to a "farce" as the far-superior league sides would breeze through their opponents. The fear proved well-founded as Derby County's reserve team scored 24 goals in their four games and conceded only 4 (3 of which came from fellow professional club Chesterfield in the Quarter Final) culminating in a 5–0 rout of Buxton in the final on 20 April 2011. In the following season Buxton gained revenge over Derby County, beating them 1–0 in the final, which was held at Chesterfield's B2net Stadium on 25 April 2012, through a Mark Reed goal.

Finals (1884 - 1893)

 1883-84: Staveley 2-1 Derby Midland
 1884–85: Staveley 2-0 Derby Midland
 1885–86: Heeley 1-0 Staveley
 1886–87: Staveley 2-0 Long Eaton Rangers
 1887–88: Derby Junction 2-0 Staveley
 1888–89: Staveley 1-0 Derby Junction
 1889–90: Derby Midland 3-1 Long Eaton Rangers
 1890–91: Long Eaton Rangers 2-1 Derby Midland
 1891–92: Derby County 5-0 Long Eaton Rangers
 1892–93: Heanor Town 7-2 Ilkeston Town

A League (1893 - 1894) 

 1893-94: Heanor Town P:26 W:22 D:1 L:3 GF:143 GA:27 PTS:45

Finals (1894 - 1945)

 1894-95: Ilkeston Town 3-0 Blackwell
 1895-96: Ilkeston Town 0-0 Heanor Town. Replay Ilkeston Town 2-1 Heanor Town.

Post-war winners (1946–present)

 1945–46: Buxton
 1946–47: Heanor Athletic
 1947–48: Derby Corinthians
 1948–49: Ilkeston Town
 1949–50: South Normanton Miners Welfare
 1950–51: Shirebrook Miners Welfare
 1951–52: Derby County 'A'
 1952–53: Ilkeston Town
 1953–54: Shirebrook Miners Welfare
 1954–55: Shirebrook Miners Welfare
 1955–56: Ilkeston Town
 1956–57: Buxton
 1957–58: Ilkeston Town
 1958–59: Belper Town
 1959–60: Buxton
 1960–61: Alfreton Town
 1961–62: Belper Town
 1962–63: Ilkeston Town
 1963–64: Belper Town
 1964–65: Long Eaton United
 1965–66: Heanor Town
 1966–67: Heanor Town
 1967–68: Heanor Town
 1968–69: Heanor Town
 1969–70: Alfreton Town
 1970–71: Heanor Town
 1971–72: Buxton
 1972–73: Alfreton Town
 1973–74: Alfreton Town
 1974–75: Matlock Town
 1975–76: Long Eaton United
 1976–77: Matlock Town
 1977–78: Matlock Town
 1978–79: Heanor Town
 1979–80: Belper Town
 1980–81: Buxton
 1981–82: Alfreton Town
 1982–83: Ilkeston Town
 1983–84: Matlock Town
 1984–85: Matlock Town
 1985–86: Buxton
 1986–87: Buxton
 1987–88: Gresley Rovers
 1988–89: Gresley Rovers
 1989–90: Gresley Rovers
 1990–91: Gresley Rovers
 1991–92: Matlock Town
 1992–93: Ilkeston Town
 1993–94: Gresley Rovers
 1994–95: Alfreton Town
 1995–96: Gresley Rovers
 1996–97: Gresley Rovers
 1997–98: Glapwell
 1998–99: Ilkeston Town
 1999–2000: Ilkeston Town
 2000–01: Glossop North End
 2001–02: Alfreton Town
 2002–03: Alfreton Town
 2003–04: Matlock Town
 2004–05: Gresley Rovers
 2005–06: Ilkeston Town
 2006–07: Ilkeston Town
 2007–08: Belper Town
 2008–09: Buxton
 2009–10: Matlock Town
 2010–11: Derby County 'XI'
 2011–12: Buxton
 2012–13: Ilkeston F.C.
 2013–14: Ilkeston F.C. 
 2014–15: Matlock Town 
 2015–16: Alfreton Town
 2016–17: Matlock Town
 2017–18: Chesterfield
 2018–19: Alfreton Town
 2019-20: competition did not finish due to Corona virus
 2020-21: competition did not take place due to Corona virus

References

External links
Derbyshire FA

County Cup competitions
Football in Derbyshire